Mullich is a surname. Notable people with the surname include:

David Mullich (born 1958), American game producer and designer
Jon Mullich (born 1961), American actor, playwright, director, and Academy Award historian